Brett Parker is an American politician who served in the Kansas House of Representatives from January 2017 to May 2021, representing the 29th District in Johnson County, Kansas. A teacher in Olathe, Kansas, Representative Parker is a resident of Overland Park, Kansas.

Representative Parker was the Democratic Agenda Chairman in the House of Representatives and the Ranking Minority Member of the Calendar and Printing Committee and the Elections Committee. Representative Parker was a former Ranking Minority Member of the Transportation and Public Safety Budget Committee.

Representative Parker is a graduate of the University of Missouri-Kansas City. He is a former vice president of the Olathe National Education Association.

2019-2020 Kansas House of Representatives Committee Assignments
Ranking Minority Member of Elections
Ranking Minority Member of Calendar and Printing
Appropriations
Higher Education Budget (2019)
Joint Committee on Pensions, Investments and Benefits

2017-2018 Kansas House of Representatives Committee Assignments
Ranking Minority Member of Transportation and Public Safety Budget (March 2018 - January 2019)
Elections
Insurance
Member of Transportation and Public Safety Budget (January 2017 - March 2018)

References

Politicians from Overland Park, Kansas
Politicians from Olathe, Kansas
Democratic Party members of the Kansas House of Representatives
University of Missouri–Kansas City alumni
21st-century American politicians
Living people
Year of birth missing (living people)
Educators from Kansas